Mahmoud Bukar Maina is a Nigerian neuroscientist, educator, and researcher, based at the University of Sussex in the United Kingdom. His research is focused on the cellular and molecular pathogenesis in Alzheimer's disease. He performs outreach work to inspire young people in Africa to pursue science and to increase public understanding of science. He is the Honorary Special Adviser on Science, Research, and Innovation to Governor Mai Mala Buni of Yobe State, Nigeria.

Early life and education 
Maina is originally from Nguru, Yobe State, Nigeria. He attended Federal Government College Buni Yadi in Yobe State for his Secondary School. He completed his Bachelor of Science in Human Anatomy at the University of Maiduguri, Nigeria, in 2007. After working at the Federal Neuropsychiatric Hospital Maiduguri and Gombe State University, he moved to the UK in 2011 to pursue a Master of Science in Cellular and Molecular Neuroscience at the University of Sussex. He went on to do a PhD at Sussex University in the lab of Louise Serpell, for which he received the Chancellor's International Research Scholarship. His PhD research was focussed on the role of nuclear Tau in Alzheimer's disease. He completed his PhD in 2017 and is now a postdoctoral research fellow at the University of Sussex. He became a Fellow of the Royal Society of Arts in 2018. He is also a visiting faculty member at Yobe State University, Nigeria.

Outreach work and awards 
Growing up in Nigeria, Maina said he was inspired by his father's science book to become a scientist. However, there was a high level of misconceptions about science and a lack of visible science role models in his community, which hinders many young people from developing an interest in science disciplines. As a result Maina founded the outreach program for TReND in Africa, an organisation that aims to improve scientific development in Sub-Saharan Africa, for example by organising workshops on open hardware and neuroscience, and science fairs for students and teachers. He also started the Science Communication Hub in Nigeria, a platform that aims to connect scientists from Nigeria and increase the visibility of Nigerian and African scientists. He has published about neuroscience research in Nigeria and in Africa's 54 countries, as part of his ongoing work to enhance neuroscience research in Africa.

In 2019 Maina started the African Science Literacy Network, a project aimed at training scientists and journalists in effectively communicating research. In September 2019 Maina organised a workshop which launched the project. As principal investigator on a Chan Zuckerberg Initiative-funded research, with support from Yobe State Government, Bukar Maina is establishing a West African Bioimaging Network to provide access and training in Bioimaging. He founded the Biomedical Science Research and Training Centre (BioRTC) at Yobe State University as part of the research and training initiative.

As a neuroscientist, he is currently developing the first sets of induced Pluripotent Stem Cell (iPSC) models from ethnically diverse African donors to increase the inclusion of African iPSC models in neurodegenerative disease research. He argues that "Africa has the greatest genetic diversity, yet African models barely exist in global neuroscience."

Maina's work also canvasses for an increase in the research output of neuroscientists on the African continent, arguing that neuroscience, which is currently driven by local priorities, has to be multidirectional; solving disease and brain-related problems while adopting artificial intelligence.

For his outreach work, he has received the Royal Society of Biology Science Communication Award in 2017 and the Young African Scientists in Europe award for the Champion of Science Storytelling Challenge. In December 2018, he was nominated for The Future Awards Africa Prize for Young Person of the Year 2018, both for his research in degenerative diseases and for his outreach work. In 2019, he was awarded the New England BioLabs Passion in Science Humanitarian Duty Award  and Kroto Public Engagement Award by Sussex's School of Life Sciences. He is a recipient of the ALBA-FKNE Diversity Prize (2022) "for his longstanding efforts to expand science capacity in Africa and promote diversity in basic neuroscience research."

References

External links 

 

Year of birth missing (living people)
Living people
Nigerian neuroscientists
Nigerian biologists
Nigerian scientists
Academics of the University of Sussex